The Benz Velo was one of the first cars, introduced by Carl Benz in 1894 as the followup to the Patent Motorwagen.  67 Benz Velos were built in 1894 and 134 in 1895. The Velo was officially introduced by Karl Benz as the Velocipede, and became the world's first large-scale production car. The Velocipede remained in production between 1894 and 1902, with a final count of over 1,200 produced.

Preceding events
Carl Benz patented the world's first stationary, static Internal combustion engine. His patent created a great demand for his vehicles, forcing Benz to move his operations in 1886 to a new factory on Waldhofstrasse in Mannheim (operating until 1908). Benz had appointed a Board of Management to help aid his growing company. The appointees suggested to Benz that he should create a less-expensive automobile suitable for mass production. In response, Benz engineered a two-passenger automobile with a  engine, which he called the Victoria. Improving on those designs, Benz created his Benz Velo.

Influences

Following automobiles
The Velo also inspired numerous copies, including Marshall (later Belsize) in Manchester, Star (Wolverhampton), and Arnold (Paddock Wood, of which only twelve were built).
Benz's Velo was particularly popular in France, where a Parisian bicycle manufacturer by the name of Émile Roger had been building Benz engines under license from Karl Benz. Roger began building Benz automobiles as well, and as a result, a majority of Benz automobiles were sold in France initially.
Many British Inventors also used Benz's patents and automobiles as starting points for their own innovations. Frederick W. Lanchester, of Birmingham, built a four-wheeled petrol-driven automobile, similar to units previously designed by Benz, which had utilized an electric starter (an adaption first seen in the Benz Velo).

A Velo was the first car introduced to South Africa, where it was demonstrated to then President Paul Kruger on 4 January 1897.

The first automobile race
Karl Benz's Velo participated in the world's first automobile race. A Parisian daily newspaper, by the name of Le Petit Journal, organized the race. The editors of Le Petit intended to display horseless carriages as a viable means of transportation. Rather than fastest time, the automobiles would be judged on whether they were safe and cost effective to operate. It took place in 1894, starting in Paris and ending in Rouen. The winners of the Paris-Rouen race were Panhard & Levassor (Panhard) and Peugeot, both French manufacturers using Benz internal combustion engines. The Velo placed fifth overall in Le Petit's race. Benz had proven with this race that his engines and his automobiles were not only attainable but also safe and reliable to operate. Eventually, manufacturers began optimizing automobile design for racing. In addition to promoting Benz and his automobiles,  the Paris-Rouen race gave birth to modern Motorsport, which now includes the likes of Formula One.

See also
 List of automotive superlatives
 Timeline of most powerful production cars
 List of Mercedes-Benz vehicles (includes section on Benz vehicles)
 Benz Viktoria

References

Velo
Mercedes-Benz vehicles
Veteran vehicles
1890s cars
German inventions
1894 introductions
Rear-engined vehicles